Steve Swanson is the former lead guitarist for the death metal band Six Feet Under. He took over guitar duties from Allen West (of Obituary), who left the band in late 1997. Before Swanson joined in February 1998, he was in Massacre with Terry Butler on bass.

He has two children.

In early December 2008, Swanson's house was broken into, and a Mesa Boogie Dual Rectifier, six guitars, a Line Six guitar amp, and a Hewlett Packard laptop were stolen.

Discography

Six Feet Under
 Maximum Violence (1999)
 Graveyard Classics (2000)
 True Carnage (2001)
 Bringer of Blood (2003)
 Graveyard Classics 2 (2004)
 13 (2005)
 Commandment (2007)
 Death Rituals (2008)
 Graveyard Classics 3 (2010)
 Wake the Night! Live in Germany (2011)
 Undead (2012)
 Unborn (2013)

References 

Living people
Musicians from Tampa, Florida
American heavy metal guitarists
Guitarists from Florida
Six Feet Under (band) members
Massacre (metal band) members
1966 births